Værnes Church is a parish church of the Church of Norway in Stjørdal municipality in Trøndelag county, Norway.  It is located just south of the town of Stjørdalshalsen. It is located along the Stjørdalselva river, just east of the Trondheim Airport, Værnes. It is the church for the Stjørdal parish which is also the seat of the Stjørdal prosti (deanery) in the Diocese of Nidaros. The white, stone church was built in a long church style in five stages from 1130 until 1190 by using plans drawn up by unknown architect. The church seats about 370 people.

History
The earliest existing historical records of the church date back to the year 1391, but the church was built before that time. The church was probably constructed  during the 12th century in several stages from around 1130-1190. It is a stone building with a rectangular nave and a narrower, rectangular chancel and with a tower to the west. The choir was completed around the year 1140 and the nave and base of the tower were finished around the year 1190. During a construction project during the 13th century, the tower was raised by two floors, the windows in the chancel and the nave were widened inside, and the base of the tower was likely vaulted at the same time. A sacristy was built on the north side of the choir in 1506-1507.

In 1814, this church served as an election church. Together with more than 300 other parish churches across Norway, it was a polling station for elections to the 1814 Norwegian Constituent Assembly which wrote the Constitution of Norway. This was Norway's first national elections. Each church parish was a constituency that elected people called "electors" who later met together in each county to elect the representatives for the assembly that was to meet in Eidsvoll later that year.

The church and tower barely survived World War II. The tower is clearly visible from a long distance, and there were fears that it could be used as a landmark and would be bombed. The church was painted in camouflage colors, and then it was painted in its normal white color after the war was over.

Media gallery

See also
List of churches in Nidaros

References

Stjørdal
Churches in Trøndelag
Long churches in Norway
Stone churches in Norway
12th-century churches in Norway
12th-century establishments in Norway
Norwegian election church